Citharichthys platophrys, the small sanddab, is a species of sanddab in the large-tooth flounder family Paralichthyidae. It is native to the eastern Pacific Ocean, ranging from  the southern Gulf of California of Mexico in the north to Peru in the south.

Like the rest of the large-tooth flounders, it has both eyes on the left side of its head.

It is a commercial fish, sold fresh and may also be processed for use in fish meal.

References

Citharichthys
Western Central American coastal fauna
Fish of Costa Rica
Fish of Ecuador
Fish of Guatemala
Fish of Panama
Fish of Peru
Fish described in 1891